Argyroeides laurion is a moth of the subfamily Arctiinae. It was described by Herbert Druce in 1884. It is found in Panama.

References

Moths described in 1884
Argyroeides
Moths of Central America